The Abia State College of Education (Technical) is a state government higher education institution located in Arochukwu, Abia State, Nigeria. It is affiliated to Michael Okpara University of Agriculture and Abia State University for its degree programmes. The current Provost is Philips O. Nto.

History 
The Abia State College of Education (Technical) was established in 1993.

Courses 
The institution offers the following courses;

 Christian Religious Studies
 French
 Education and Economics
 Home Economics
 Mathematics Education
 Business Education
 Political Science Education
 Education and English
 Music
 Education and Igbo
 Chemistry Education
 Agricultural Science
 Biology Education
 Computer Education
 Early Childhood Care Education

Affiliation 
The institution is affiliated with the Michael Okpara University of Agriculture and Abia State University to offer programmes leading to Bachelor of Education, (B.Ed.) in;

References 

Universities and colleges in Nigeria
1993 establishments in Nigeria